The Campeonato Nacional de Juniores is the top level of the Portuguese football league system for youth players (19-year-old and under). It is administrated by the Portuguese Football Federation. The league started in 1938 and has been historically dominated by the Big Three clubs.

Format
The Campeonato Nacional de Juniores begins in the first weekend of September and ends in June. The Nacional de Juniors season is similar to the senior players' Primeira Liga playing a double round-robin points based system. There are two groups composed of 12 teams, North and South. The top four teams with the most points in each group progress to the Apuramento de Campeão, where they face each other in a similar way to the first round, to determine the champion.

The bottom eight teams of each group, progress to the Apuramento de Manutenção, where they face each other. The bottom three of each group are relegated.

Winners

Performance by club

Notes

References

Football leagues in Portugal
Recurring sporting events established in 1938
1938 establishments in Portugal